The Killeen Gang was an Irish-American Boston-based crime organization started by Donnie Killeen. At one time, the gang was  led by Whitey Bulger.

Along with Bulger, Billy O'Sullivan was a notable associate.  The Killeen Gang eventually combined with the Mullen Gang to become the Winter Hill Gang.

References

Gangs in Massachusetts